Jodi Ekdin (The Sacrifice as the English version) is a Bangladeshi movie released in 2019. This movie was directed by Mohammad Mostafa Kamal Raz and produced by Bengal Multimedia Limited. The main cast in this movie are Tahsan, Srabanti, Taskeen and child actor Afrin Shikha Raisa.

Cast 
 Tahsan Rahman Khan as Faisal
 Srabanti Chatterjee as Aritri Ashraf
 Taskeen Rahman as Jamie
 Fakhrul Bashar Masum as Hanif
 Saberi Alam
 Afrin Shikha Raisa

Story 
The story of the film is based on a family. It illustrates another kind of affection for parents. In the movie, Onik played the role of father Faisal and Afrin Shikha in the role of Rupkotha.

Music 
The main music director of this movie is Naved Parvez and the movie songs was composed and sung by Hridoy Khan

Release 
The film was initially released in 22 theaters.

References 

Bengali-language Bangladeshi films
2010s Bengali-language films
Films shot in Cox's Bazar